Garlat is a village and union council (an administrative subdivision) of Mansehra District in the Khyber-Pakhtunkhwa province of Pakistan. It is located in Balakot tehsil and lies in an area that was affecteded by the 2005 Kashmir earthquake. HASSA is famous village council of Garlat.

References

Union councils of Mansehra District
Populated places in Mansehra District
2005 Kashmir earthquake